Iisalmen maalaiskunta was a municipality in Eastern Finland in Kuopio Province. The municipality was founded in 1873. Before the year 1922 the municipality included also Sonkajärvi and Vieremä. The municipality was consolidated with the city of Iisalmi in the beginning of year 1970. In 1963 there was 14 079 inhabitants in Iisalmen maalaiskunta.

Well-known people from Iisalmen maalaiskunta 
Seppo Kääriäinen, politician
Jaakko Teppo, musician.

Former municipalities of Finland